Nitin Kapoor was a producer in Bollywood Films. He was the husband of South Indian actress Jayasudha and a cousin of the renowned Bollywood actor Jeetendra.

With Jayasudha, whom he married in 1985, he has two sons, Nihar Kapoor and Shreayan Kapoor. Nitin produced movies under the banner JSK Combines. Nitin committed suicide by jumping from a building on 14 March 2017. According to his wife, he suffered from bipolar disorder.

Filmography
Nitin Kapoor produced Hands Up! in 2000, Kalikalam starring his wife Jayasudha in 1991 and Mera Pati Sirf Mera Hai in 1990 starring his brother Jeetendra and Rekha. He was also an Assistant Director of the 1984 movie Asha Jyoti starring Rajesh Khanna and Reena Roy.
 Aadi Dampatulu (1986)
 Kanchana Sita (1987)
 Kalikalam (1990)
 Mera Pati Sirf Mera Hai (1990)
 Adrustam (1992)
 Vinta Kodallu (1993)
 Handsup (2000)

References

External links

1959 births
Hindi film producers
Punjabi people
Place of birth missing
People with bipolar disorder
2017 suicides
Suicides by jumping in India
Artists who committed suicide